K. Pazhanisamy was a Tamil language writer, Marxist thinker, literary critic and scholar from Tamil Nadu, India, who wrote under the pen name Kovai Gnani.  He introduced the Marxist ideology in Tamil literature, in the early 1990s, and authored 28 books on literary criticism, five collections of essays, three collections of poetry, eleven anthologies and edited many books.

He received several awards including Tamil Nadu government's best book award and Lifetime Achievement Award by The Tamil Literary Garden.

Biography
Pazhanisamy was born in 1935, in Somannur in Coimbatore, of Tamil Nadu, one of the eight children of Krishnaswamy and Mariammal. He graduated in Tamil literature from Annamalai University and worked as a Tamil teacher in a school in Coimbatore for 30 years. In 1988, at the age of 55, he lost his sight due to diabetes, but that did not stop his quest for reading and writing.

As a Marxist thinker, or as a person moved towards Tamil nationalism, he did not associate with any political party or movement in India. He approached Marxism only as a philosophy. Gnani opposed classical Marxism, which approached culture only economically, and argued for the need for a Marxism suitable for India (Mannukketra Marxism) and explained it in his writings and speeches.

He was the mentor for many modern Tamil writers and poets. His contact with eminent Tamil scholars and his self-study, which continued for over 50 years, gave him an in-depth knowledge of ancient and modern Tamil literature. His involvement in Marxism and Tamil made him a critic of Tamil literature and contemporary Tamil society. He who made a significant role in founding the poetry movement Vaanampaadi, which focuses discovering new poets, with writers like Sirpi Balasubramaniam, Mehta and Bhuviyarash. As part of the Little Magazine Movement, he edited Tamil language little magazines like Puthia Thalaimurai,  Vanampadihe and ran magazines like Marxia Ayvithazh, Parimanam and Nigazh. His books are being used as a subject of study in the Tamil departments of various universities in India.

Personal life and death
Gnani and his wife Indrani had two sons. He died on 20 July 2020 at Coimbatore.

Partial bibliography

Puthiya Thalamurai (Meaning: Generation)
Marxiyam Periyariam (Meaning: Marxism and Periyarism)
Marxiamum Tamil Ilakkiyamum (Meaning: Marxism and Tamil Literature)
Tamilil Naveenathuvam Pinnaveenathuvam (Meaning: Modernism and Postmodernism in Tamil)
Tamil Ilakkiyam Indrum Iniyum (Meaning:bTamil Literature: Today and Hereafter)
Kadavul Yen Innum Saagavillai? (Meaning: Why Isn't God Dead Yet?)
Kallum Mullum Kavithaigalum (Meaning: Stones, Thorns and Poetry)
Marxiya Azhakiyal (Meaning: Marxist aesthetics)

Awards and honors
Tamil Nadu government's best book award 2006 (Marxiyam Periyariam)
Pudumaipithan Vilakku Viruthu 1998
Parithimaar Kalaignar Award for the best Tamil scholar, by the SRM University
'Hindu Tamil Disai' Achievement Award 2019
Lifetime Achievement Award (Iyal award) 2009 by The Tamil Literary Garden

References

1935 births
2020 deaths
Marxist theorists
Indian Marxist writers
Indian Marxists
Indian male writers
20th-century Indian essayists
Poets from Tamil Nadu
Tamil writers
Annamalai University alumni
Indian Tamil people
20th-century Indian poets
Indian literary critics
People from Coimbatore district